Christopher Khristoforovich Roop (Russian, Христофор Христофорович Рооп; May 1, 1831 – 1917) was an Imperial Russian army officer. He was promoted to Polkovnik (colonel) in 1857, major general in 1863 and lieutenant general in 1871.

Awards 
Order of Saint Stanislaus (House of Romanov), 3rd class, 1856
Order of Saint Stanislaus (House of Romanov), 2nd class, 1858
Order of Saint Anna, 2nd class, 1862
Order of Saint Stanislaus (House of Romanov), 1st class, 1865
Order of Saint Anna, 1st class, 1867
Order of Saint Vladimir, 2nd class, 1874
Order of Saint George, 3rd degree, 1877
Order of the White Eagle (Russian Empire), 1883
Order of Saint Alexander Nevsky, 1888
Order of Saint Vladimir, 1st class, 1899
Order of Saint Andrew, 1913

References 
 Альманах русских государственных деятелей. 84–85. 146.

1831 births
1917 deaths
Recipients of the Order of Saint Stanislaus (Russian), 3rd class
Recipients of the Order of Saint Stanislaus (Russian), 2nd class
Recipients of the Order of St. Anna, 2nd class
Recipients of the Order of Saint Stanislaus (Russian), 1st class
Recipients of the Order of St. Anna, 1st class
Recipients of the Order of St. Vladimir, 2nd class
Recipients of the Order of St. George of the Third Degree
Recipients of the Order of the White Eagle (Russia)
Recipients of the Order of St. Vladimir, 1st class